The Campaign for the Welfare State is a progressive public policy advocacy organization and think tank in Norway, founded in 1999 by six trade unions to promote the welfare state as a political system and associated policies, and to oppose economic liberalism and privatization and strengthen democratic control of the society's resources in particular. It is a broad alliance of 23 trade unions and other organizations representing 1 million members (out of a population of 5 million). Its director is Asbjørn Wahl. The organization organizes the annual Welfare Conference (Velferdskonferansen). Its offices are housed by the Norwegian Union of Municipal and General Employees.

Members
The following national trade unions and associations are members of the organization:

Arbeidssøkerforbundet
El&IT-forbundet
Norwegian Union of Municipal and General Employees
Norwegian Union of Social Educators and Social Workers
FO-studentene
Union of Employees in Commerce and Offices
Industri Energi
LO Kommune
Kvinnefronten
Kvinnegruppa Ottar
Landsutvalget for Udelt og Fådelt Skole
Norwegian Farmers and Smallholders Union
Norsk Fengsels- og Friomsorgsforbund
Norsk Folkehøgskolelag
Norsk Lokomotivmannsforbund
Norsk Pensjonistforbund
Norwegian Civil Service Union
Norwegian Transport Workers' Union
SAFE
Skolenes Landsforbund
Tyrilistiftelsen
Union of Education Norway
The Welfare Alliance

References

External links
 velferdsstaten.no

1999 establishments in Norway
Think tanks established in 1999
Think tanks based in Norway
Political advocacy groups in Norway
Political and economic think tanks based in Europe